The 2018 Real Salt Lake season is the team's 14th year of existence, and their 14th consecutive season in Major League Soccer, the top division of the American soccer pyramid.

Background

Non-competitive

Preseason

Mobile Mini Sun Cup

Orlando

Friendly

Competitions

MLS regular season

2018 Major League Soccer season

Standings

Western Conference Table

Overall table

Results summary

Match results

MLS Cup Playoffs 

Real Salt Lake eliminated on aggregate goals, 3–5

U.S. Open Cup

Stats

Stats from MLS Regular season, MLS playoffs, CONCACAF Champions league, and U.S. Open Cup are all included.
First tie-breaker for goals is assists; first for assists and shutouts is minutes played.

Club

Roster
 Age calculated as of the start of the 2018 season.
, Compliant with roster freeze date as per MLS rules.

Transfers
''

In

Out

Notes

Loans

In

Out

Trialist

See also 
 Real Monarchs

References

Real Salt Lake seasons
2018 Major League Soccer season